Eddie Smith (born 5 September 1965) is a Scottish former football referee.

References

External links
Eddie Smith, Soccerbase

1965 births
Living people
Scottish football referees
Scottish police officers
Scottish Football League referees
Scottish Premier League referees
Officers in Scottish police forces